Tanguturi Prakasam Panthulu (23 August 1872 – 20 May 1957) was an Indian jurist, political leader, social reformer, and anti-colonial nationalist who served as the chief minister of the Madras Presidency. Prakasam subsequently became the first chief minister of the erstwhile Andhra State, created by the partition of Madras State along the linguistic lines. Prakasam was known as "Andhra Kesari" which translates to "Lion of Andhra". The Andhra Pradesh government issued G.O RT-2500 on 10 August 2014 declaring his birth anniversary a State holiday.

Early life 
Tanguturi Prakasam Panthulu was born into a Telugu speaking family of Subbamma and Gopalakrishnayya in the village of Addanki,  from Ongole in Madras presidency (now Prakasam district, Andhra Pradesh). When he was 11, his father died and his mother had to run a boarding house at Ongole, a profession that was looked down upon at the time.

When E. Hanumantha Rao, his teacher at school, moved to Rajamahendravaram, he took Prakasam along with him as that place had better opportunities for education. He acted in Gayopakhyanam by Chilakamarti Lakshmi Narasimham in 1890 along with his teacher. He was interested in becoming a lawyer since childhood, but Prakasam failed his matriculation examination.  However, he managed to go to Madras and become a second-grade pleader.  Returning to Rajamahendravaram, he eventually became a successful lawyer.  He was elected as Municipal Chairman of Rajamahendravaram in 1904 when he was 31 years old. This election was not easy for Prakasam. He was funded for his education by Zamindar Kanchumarthi Ramachandra Rao, who was at that time received patronage from Raja Vogeti Ramakrishnayya, a wealthy landlord  and was also a municipal councillor for a long time and an honorary magistrate in Rajamahendravaram under Ramachandra Rao. Prakasam was given the utmost support by Ramachandra Rao even though they disagreed in their political ideology.

In England 

During one of his professional visits to Madras on a court case, a barrister was impressed with his legal acumen and suggested that he become a barrister.  As a second-grade pleader, Prakasam could not argue cases at higher courts as only barristers were allowed to do so.  Prakasam took the idea to his heart and decided to go to England to pursue legal studies.  It was considered a sacrilege to cross the seas during those days.  However, as Mahatma Gandhi had done before him, Prakasam made a promise to his mother that he would abstain from eating non-vegetarian food, smoking and drinking.  He reached England in 1904.  In England, he joined the Royal India Society and worked for the election of Dadabhai Naoroji to the House of Commons.

In the service of public 

After completing the barrister course with a certificate of honour in London, Prakasam relocated to Madras high court.  He was one of the only Telugu barristers to be successful; until then, most of the successful lawyers were either European or Tamil.  He dealt with both civil and criminal cases. Of the latter, one of the important cases was the Ashe murder case.  Ashe was the Collector of Tirunelveli and was shot dead in 1907 by Vanchinathan. This was at a time when Bipin Chandra Pal, the nationalist leader from Bengal, was touring the region, making fiery speeches on nationalism.  Prakasam defended one of the accused and ensured that he got away with a light sentence. Prakasam also edited Law Times, a legal magazine.  The same year he presided over Bipin Chandra Pal's lecture at Madras when others were afraid to come forward, given that the government of the day considered Pal's speeches to border on sedition. He started attending the Congress Party sessions regularly after the Lucknow Pact and signed the Satyagraha pledge in October 1921.  He gave up his lucrative law practice.  He also started and was the working editor of a newspaper Swarajya (literally self-rule). The paper was published simultaneously in English, Telugu and Tamil.

Prakasam ran a national school and a khādī production centre.  He was elected the general secretary of the Congress Party in December 1921 at the Ahmedabad session.  Whenever there was unrest or strife such as a riot, he tried to be there so as to comfort people. He visited Punjab during Akali Satyagraha and the Hindu-Muslim riots in Multan.  He toured Kerala during the Moplah rebellion despite a ban on visitors from outside the area and had his property at Ooty attached by the government as a consequence. In 1922, during the non-cooperation movement, he organised a demonstration by 30,000 Congress volunteers at Guntur.  In 1926, he was elected to the Central Legislative Assembly on a Congress Party ticket.

Andhra Kesari appellation and struggle for independence 

When the Simon Commission visited India, public decided to boycott it with the slogan "Simon, go back". There were a host of reasons for this boycott, the most important being that the commission did not have a single Indian in its ranks.  The commission was greeted with demonstration of black flags wherever it went.  When the commission visited Madras on 3 February 1928, Prakasam Pantulu gave the slogan "Go back Simon Commission".The English soldiers warned the demonstrators headed by Prakasam. They threatened to shoot if they (the demonstrators) moved an inch forward. Prakasam Pantulu baring his chest came forward. This made the British soldiers dumb struck. This exemplary courage earned him the title "Andhra Kesari". After this incident, he was known respectfully as "Andhra Kesari" (the Lion of Andhra).

In 1930, when the Congress party wanted all the legislators to resign, he did so but was not convinced about its alternative programme and hence contested and won the by-election.  He joined the Congress Party led by Madan Mohan Malaviya but resigned from it as well and persuaded others to do so after Mahatma Gandhi and the Congress Party broke the salt tax law with the Dandi March.  Prakasam also resigned as a legislator and was at the forefront in breaking the tax law at Madras.  In the meantime, he had to suspend the publication of Swarajya due to the high deposit demanded by the government.  It was revived after the Gandhi–Irwin Pact of 1931 but it had to be suspended again due to cash flow problems. Unsuccessful attempts were made to restart it again in 1935.

In 1937, Congress Party contested the provincial elections and achieved majority in Madras province, among others. Though Prakasam was in the running for Prime Minister's post, he made way for Rajaji, who returned to active politics as per the wishes of the Congress Working Committee.  Prakasam became the revenue minister – his major contribution was the founding and chairing of the Zamindari Enquiry Committee which looked at the structural distortions in agriculture perpetrated due to the Zamindari system followed by the British Government.  With the onset of World War II, the Congress ministries resigned from office as they were not consulted by the government about India's participation. Prakasam was the first prominent leader from Southern India to offer individual satyagraha against the war effort in 1941.

Prakasam was arrested and jailed for more than three years for participating in the Quit India movement of 1942.  After his release in 1945, he toured South India to get back in touch with the masses.

Prime Minister of Madras Presidency 

In 1946, after the Congress' victory in elections in Madras Presidency, Prakasam became the Prime minister on 30 April 1946, as he and Kamaraj, a Tamil leader, were against Rajaji – the choice of leaders such as Gandhi and Nehru – becoming the Prime minister. However, the government lasted for only 11 months, as it was felt that Prakasam was not accommodating enough to various interests and corruption charges. As Prakasam went against his interest, Mahatma Gandhi faulted Prakasam for accepting gifts and using party funds, ordered Prakasam to resign from congress party.

During his tenure as Premier, Prakasam publicly declared his intention to scrap all existing textile industries in the province and replace them with khadi manufacturing and weaving units. In February 1947, Communists broke into a full-scale revolt. On Vallabhbhai Patel's advice, Prakasam responded with widespread arrests and tough crackdown on arsonists.

Post-independence 

Prakasam visited Hyderabad State in 1948, while the Nizam was still in power, although Prime Minister Jawaharlal Nehru warned against doing so because of concern for his personal safety. He met Qasim Rizvi, the leader of the Razakars, and warned him about "pushing his luck too far"..

In 1952, he formed the Hyderabad State Praja Party (Hyderabad State People's party) and ensured that all the sitting ministers of the Congress Party were defeated. However, Praja party could not come into power by its own and the coalition that he put together collapsed even before a show of strength could be contemplated.

Meanwhile, in December 1952, Potti Sreeramulu died fasting for the cause of a separate state for the Telugu-speaking people. On 1 October 1953, the state of Andhra was created and Prakasam was unanimous choice for Chief minister of the new state. He was not only the party's choice, but the people's choice too. However, due to corruption charges and opposition from the communists and halting support from the socialists, the government fell after a year. Mid-term elections were held in 1955 by which time Prakasam had more or less retired from active politics. On 1 November 1956, Telugu-speaking parts of the erstwhile Hyderabad State were merged with Andhra State to form Andhra Pradesh. Marathi-speaking parts (Aurangabad region) of the Hyderabad state were merged with Bombay State (which later split into Gujarat and Maharashtra) and Kannada-speaking parts (Gulbarga region) were merged with Mysore State. Neelam Sanjiva Reddy, a future President of India and a staunch follower of Prakasam, became the chief minister. Prakasam was active in touring the state promoting harijan issues (dalit issues). On one such visit to a harijanwada near Ongole, he suffered from severe sunstroke. He was admitted to a Hyderabad hospital and died there on 20 May 1957.

Institutions named after Prakasam 

Andhra Kesari University, Ongole
 Sri Tanguturi Prakasam Memorial Institute of Advance Studies in Education, Nellore, SPSR Nellore Dt, Andhra Pradesh. [STPM IASE]
 Sri Prakasam Government Junior College & High School (1974) – Addanki, Prakasam district
Andhra Kesari Centenary Junior College Degree College – Rajamahendravaram
 Prakasam Engineering College – Kandukur, Prakasam district
 Sri Tanguturi Prakasam Pantulu Government Junior College – Yanam, Yanam district (near East Godavari district)
 Andhra Kesari Yuvajana Samiti – a socio-cultural organisation, est. 1962
Andhra Kesari Prakasam Junior College – Chirala, Prakasam district
 Prakasam Public School – Inkollu, Prakasam district
 Andhra Kesari Vidya Kendram Junior College – Ongole, Prakasam district
 Sri Prakasam Vidya Niketan High School, Anand Nagar Colony, Hyderabad district
 Andhra Kesari Tanguturi Prakasam Pantulu Government High School (AKTP High School), Satyanarayana Puram, Vijayawada
 Prakasam centenary Memorial High school, Rajamahendravaram,

Places named after him 
 Prakasam district, Andhra Pradesh
 Prakasam Nagar, Begumpet Telangana
 Prakash Nagar (Prakasam Nagar previously), Rajamahendravaram
 Prakash Nagar, Visakhapatnam 
 Andhra Kesari Nagar(A.K.Nagar), SPSR Nellore District,
 Nrithya Prakasha Varshini (Bangalore)-Dance school started by Prakasam Grand daughter Shyamala Muralikrishna

Autobiography 

Prakasam's autobiography is titled Naa Jeevitha Yatra (My Life's Journey) and published by Telugu Samithi. This book has four parts – the first two are about his early life and his involvement in freedom fighting in India, the third is about getting independence and government formation in Andhra Pradesh, and the last (written by Tenneti Viswanadham) discusses his political career and the changes he brought to Andhra. Emesco published them as a single hard cover edition in 1972.

References 

Telugu people
1872 births
1957 deaths
People from Prakasam district
Indian tax resisters
Tamil Nadu ministers
Members of the Central Legislative Assembly of India
Indian lawyers
Indian barristers
Indian independence activists from Andhra Pradesh
Chief ministers from Indian National Congress
Chief ministers of Indian states
Indian National Congress politicians from Andhra Pradesh
Andhra movement